Ashleigh Barty defeated Elena Rybakina in the final, 6–3, 6–2 to win the women's singles title at the 2022 Adelaide International 1.

Iga Świątek was the defending champion, but lost in the semifinals to Barty.

Seeds 
The top two seeds received a bye into the second round.

Draw

Finals

Top half

Bottom half

Qualifying

Seeds

Qualifiers

Qualifying draw

First qualifier

Second qualifier

Third qualifier

Fourth qualifier

Fifth qualifier

Sixth qualifier

References

External links
 Main & Qualifying draw in WTA website
 Main draw
 Qualifying draw

Adelaide International 1
Adelaide International (tennis)
Adelaide